This is a list of television films produced for the cable networks Hallmark Channel (HC) and Hallmark Movies & Mysteries (HMM). Such films are currently called Hallmark Channel Original Movies and Hallmark Movies and Mysteries.

The Hallmark Channel was officially launched in August 2001, with its sister channel Hallmark Movies & Mysteries (originally Hallmark Movie Channel) launched in January 2004. In addition to stand-alone original films, both channels broadcast a number of original film series, including Garage Sale Mystery, Jesse Stone, Signed, Sealed, Delivered, the Aurora Teagarden Mysteries and The Good Witch, as well having produced mystery-themed wheel series.

The Hallmark Channel achieved its highest-ever broadcast premiere ratings with the 2014 original movie Christmas Under Wraps, starring Candace Cameron Bure, which was watched by 5.8 million viewers. Both networks receive their highest ratings during their "Countdown to Christmas" period, with a succession of festive original films being broadcast from late October to late December.

A number of these films are also carried in Canada by the W Network and Citytv under content distribution agreements with Hallmark parent Crown Media; the vast majority of Hallmark Channel films are filmed in Canada and thus qualify for Canadian content quotas. In the United Kingdom, Hallmark Original Movies are shown on Movies 24, a sister channel.

Umbrella series
The channels have broadcast a number of umbrella or 'wheel series', featuring premieres of original films.

 * Hallmark Hall of Fame originally premiered back in 1951 on NBC, but its movies began to be shown exclusively on Hallmark Channel starting on November 30, 2014 with the release of One Christmas Eve.

Seasonal programming
The channels also produce annual seasonal programming blocks, which include premieres of original films.

 * Formerly known as The Most Wonderful Movies of Christmas and The Most Wonderful Miracles of Christmas.
 † Formerly known as Countdown to Valentine's Day and Love Ever After.
 ‡ Formerly known as Spring Fever and Spring Fling.
 # Formerly known as Winterfest.
 ✤ Formerly known as Fall Harvest.

Film series
Some Hallmark films are a part of a larger film series. Below is an alphabetically-sorted list of all film series and the number of films in each.

 (HD) Hallmark Drama is a sister channel to HC and HMM.
 * Film added to wheel series after an original stand-alone film.
 † Jesse Stone films premiere on HC, but are repeated on, and considered to be a key franchise for, HMM.
 + Also TV series.

Hallmark Entertainment
Some of the movies do not fall under any of the aforementioned groups. The following list consists of television films and miniseries produced for or by Hallmark Entertainment that did not premiere on either Hallmark Channel, its sister channels, or as part of the Hallmark Hall of Fame anthology series.

Hallmark Channel Original Movies (2000–2015)

2016

Hallmark Channel

(W) Winterfest, (CtVD) Countdown to Valentine's Day, (SF) Spring Fling, (JW) June Weddings, (SN) Summer Nights, (FH) Fall Harvest, and (CtC) Countdown to Christmas are seasonal programming blocks.

Hallmark Movies & Mysteries

2017

Hallmark Channel

(W) Winterfest, (CtVD) Countdown to Valentine's Day, (SF) Spring Fling, (JW) June Weddings, (SN) Summer Nights, (FH) Fall Harvest, and (CtC) Countdown to Christmas are seasonal programming blocks.
 Simultaneous premiere on HC and HMM.

Hallmark Movies & Mysteries

2018

Hallmark Channel

(W) Winterfest, (CtVD) Countdown to Valentine's Day, (SF) Spring Fever, (JW) June Weddings, (SN) Summer Nights, (FH) Fall Harvest, and (CtC) Countdown to Christmas are seasonal programming blocks.

Hallmark Movies & Mysteries

(MoC) Miracles of Christmas is a seasonal programming block.

2019

Hallmark Channel

(W) Winterfest, (CtVD) Countdown to Valentine's Day, (SF) Spring Fever, (CtS) Countdown to Summer, (JW) June Weddings, (SN) Summer Nights, (FH) Fall Harvest, and (CtC) Countdown to Christmas are seasonal programming blocks.

Hallmark Movies & Mysteries

(MoC) Miracles of Christmas is a seasonal programming block.
 Simultaneous premiere on HC and HMM.
† Part of Gold Crown Christmas Week: Christmas in July.

2020

Hallmark Channel

(W) Winterfest, (LEA) Love Ever After, (SF) Spring Fling, (ALR) A Little Romance, (SN) Summer Nights, (FH) Fall Harvest, and (CtC) Countdown to Christmas are seasonal programming blocks.

Hallmark Movies & Mysteries

(MoC) Miracles of Christmas is a seasonal programming block.
 Simultaneous premiere on HC and HMM.

2021

Hallmark Channel

(NYNM) New Year New Movies!, (LEA) Love Ever After, (SF) Spring Fling, (SN) Summer Nights, (FH) Fall Harvest, and (CtC) Countdown to Christmas are seasonal programming blocks.
† Part of Christmas in July.

Hallmark Movies & Mysteries

(MoC) Miracles of Christmas is a seasonal programming block.

Hallmark Movies Now

2022

Hallmark Channel

(NYNM) New Year New Movies!, (L) Loveuary, (SiL) Spring into Love, (SN) Summer Nights, (CiJ) Christmas in July, (FiL) Fall into Love, and (CtC) Countdown to Christmas are seasonal programming blocks.

Hallmark Movies & Mysteries

(HM) Hallmark Mahogany are films under Hallmark's Mahogany banner. (HD) Hallmark DaySpring are films under Hallmark's DaySpring banner. (MoC) Miracles of Christmas is a seasonal programming block.

2023

Hallmark Channel

(NYNM) New Year New Movies!, (L) Loveuary, and (SiL) Spring into Love are seasonal programming blocks.

Hallmark Movies & Mysteries

(HM) Hallmark Mahogany are films under Hallmark's Mahogany banner. (HD) Hallmark DaySpring are films under Hallmark's DaySpring banner.

Hallmark Movies Now

Announced or In Development

Aurora Teagarden Mysteries: Something New
A Biltmore Christmas
Carrot Cake Murder: A Hannah Swensen Mystery
Christmas Goals
The Dancing Detective: A Deadly Tango
Double Quince
Dream Moms
Haul Out the Holly 2
Match Me, Please
My Week in Wyoming
The Santa Summit
The Wedding Contract
The Wedding Season
Winter Castle Royal Romance

Highest-rated premieres

Hallmark Channel

Top 10 Christmas premieres

Within a calendar year

Hallmark Movies & Mysteries

Top 10 Christmas premieres

Within a calendar year

See also
List of Hallmark Hall of Fame episodes (and Category)
List of programs broadcast by Hallmark Channel (and Category)

References

External links

Official websites
Hallmark Channel
Hallmark Movies & Mysteries
Hallmark Drama
Hallmark Movies Now
Crown Media Family Networks (parent company)
Crown Media Press

Other
Hallmark Channel on IMDbPro
Hallmark Entertainment on IMDbPro

Hallmark